Manjushrikirti or Manjughoshikirti (Skt. Mañjuśrīkīrti;) in a name which refers to different figures in Indian Buddhism.

Buddhist scholars 
Mañjuśrīkīrti is the name of a student of Candrakīrti (c. 600 – c. 650).

Mañjuśrīkīrti is also the name of an Indian Buddhist scholar who wrote a commentary to the Samādhirāja Sūtra (King of Samādhis Sūtra) called the Kīrtimala (Tibetan: grags pa'i phreng ba) which survives in Tibetan translation. Four other works in the Tibetan canon are attributed to him, one text on Grammar and three works on tantra. His work shows strong influence of Yogacara Buddhism. Little else is known about this author.

It is doubtful that these two are the same figure, since the author of the Kīrtimala is strongly influenced by Yogacara vijñanavada, a view rejected by Candrakīrti.

King of Shambhala 

Mañjuśrīkīrti is said to have been the eighth king of Shambhala and is considered to be the second incarnation in the lineage of the Panchen Lamas of Tibet. As his name indicates, is considered to have been an incarnation of Manjushri, the Bodhisattva of Wisdom.

Manjushrikirti was born in Shambhala, the son of King Deva-Indra and his queen, Kauśikí. His rule is said to have extended over "hundreds of petty kings and a hundred thousand cities." He is said to have expelled 300,510 followers of heretical doctrine of the Mlechhas or "materialistic barbarians", some of whom worshipped the sun, but after reconsidering, he brought them back and they asked for his teachings. Next he united all the castes, or religious factions, of Shambala into one Vajra or 'Diamond' Caste. Consequentially, he was the first king of Shambhala to be given the title Kalki (Tib. Rigden), meaning "Holder of the Castes" or "Wisdom Holder."

He is said in Tibetan sources to have taken the throne 674 years after the death of Gautama Buddha. Following the Tibetan sources, which place the parinirvana in 833 BCE, he would have become king of Shambhala in 159 BCE. There is, however, no consensus on the date of the death of the Buddha. Modern scholars have proposed dates of 563, 483, 410 or 400 BCE. These would suggest dates for his accession of 111, 191, 264 or 274 CE respectively.

He then put the Kalachakra teachings in a condensed and simplified form called the "Sri Kalachakra" or "Laghutantra".

This work is also called the Condensed Kālachakra Tantra (bsdus rgyud, laghutantra). It is usual now simply called the Kālachakra Tantra, the original longer version one is no longer extant.

Lineage of the Panchen Lamas 
In the lineage of the Panchen Lamas of Tibet there were considered to be four "Indian" and three Tibetan incarnations of Amitabha Buddha before Khedrup Gelek Pelzang, who is recognised as the 1st Panchen Lama. The lineage starts with Subhuti, and Manjushrikirti is considered the second incarnation.

Footnotes

See also
Kings of Shambhala
Shambhala

External links
International Kalachakra Network

Tibetan Buddhist mythology
Panchen Lamas